Mladen Bartulović (born 5 October 1986) is a Croatian retired footballer and manager. He spent most of his playing career in Ukrainian Premier League representing various clubs from Central Ukraine: Kryvbas, Inhulets, Vorskla, others.

Club career
Bartulović made his professional debut for HNK Hajduk Split in 2004. In 2005 he appeared for the first time in continental competitions (UEFA Champions League). While the Hajduk's performance was poor at international stage, Bartulović was noticed by scouts. Since 2006 he plays in Ukraine. 

At first Bartulović was a regular on the FC Dnipro's first team in 2006–07 season, but following seasons he started to play for the club's reserves and later was loaned to Dnipro's unofficial farm club Kryvbas, for which he capped over 100 games at the Ukrainian Premier League. In 2015–16 he played for FC Vorskla Poltava.

International career
Bartulović made his debut for Croatia in a February 2006 friendly match against Hong Kong and has earned a total of 2 caps, scoring no goals. His second and final international was a November 2009 friendly against Liechtenstein.

Personal life
His wife Natalya is a daughter of the Ukrainian football coach Serhiy Bashkyrov.

Honors
Inhulets Petrove
 Ukrainian First League: 2019–20 

Miedź Legnica
 I liga: 2017–18

HNK Hajduk Split
 Croatian First League: 2004–05
 Croatian Super Cup: 2004, 2005

Dnipro Dnipropetrovsk
UEFA Europa League (1): runner-up 2014–15

Gallery

References

External links
 
 
 

1986 births
Living people
People from Kakanj
Croats of Bosnia and Herzegovina
Association football fullbacks
Association football midfielders
Croatian footballers
Croatia under-21 international footballers
Croatia international footballers
HNK Hajduk Split players
FC Dnipro players
FC Kryvbas Kryvyi Rih players
FC Arsenal Kyiv players
FC Karpaty Lviv players
FC Vorskla Poltava players
Miedź Legnica players
FC Volyn Lutsk players
FC Inhulets Petrove players
Croatian Football League players
Ukrainian Premier League players
I liga players
Ukrainian First League players
Croatian expatriate footballers
Expatriate footballers in Ukraine
Croatian expatriate sportspeople in Ukraine
Expatriate footballers in Poland
Croatian expatriate sportspeople in Poland
Croatian football managers
FC Inhulets Petrove managers
Ukrainian Premier League managers
Croatian expatriate football managers
Expatriate football managers in Ukraine